Armaria are a kind of closed, labeled cupboards that were  used for book storage in ancient times up till the middle ages.

They were probably used in the library of Alexandria. They were also used for storage of important papal documents in the Vatican Archives.

References

 http://www.digital-brilliance.com/kab/alex.htm (under  "the Roman library")... Although this refers to chests instead? Source used not traceable from that page...

Cabinets (furniture)